The sixth series of The Only Way Is Essex, a British semi-reality television programme, began airing on 22 July 2012 on ITV2. The series concluded on 22 August 2012 after ten episodes. This is the first series to include new cast members Darrell Privett, who is the ex-boyfriend of Lauren Pope, and was the only series to feature Jamie Reed, who later returned for two cameo appearances during the eighth series. It also included the brief return of original cast member Mark Wright, who made an appearance without a speaking part. His dad, Mark Wright Snr also returned to the series having previously appeared briefly in the third series. This was the final series to feature Lauren Goodger until her return during The Only Way Is Essexmas special in 2015. The series focused heavily on the rivalry between Lucy and Sam when Sam investigates rumours that Mario has been cheating, it also includes a love triangle between Lauren G, Lauren P and Tom P, and a declaration of love as Bobby realises the extent of his feelings towards Charlie.

Cast

Episodes

{| class="wikitable plainrowheaders" style="width:100%; background:#fff;"
|-style="color:black"
! style="background:#FFCC99;"| SeriesNo.
! style="background:#FFCC99;"| EpisodeNo.
! style="background:#FFCC99;"| Title
! style="background:#FFCC99;"| Original airdate
! style="background:#FFCC99;"| Duration
! style="background:#FFCC99;"| UK viewers

|}

Reception

Ratings

References

The Only Way Is Essex
2012 in British television
2012 British television seasons